Corey Sanders (born March 7, 1975) is an American boxing trainer and former professional boxer. Known as "T-Rex", Sanders' most notable victory came in an upset knockout against future WBC world champion Oleg Maskaev in 2002, which temporarily derailed Maskaev's plans of fighting for a title. Sanders' other notable opponents included Michael Grant, Andrew Golota, DaVarryl Williamson and Timo Hoffmann. Sanders is perhaps best remembered for his wild brawl with Golota, which saw both fighters trading heavy blows on the inside throughout the fight, and Sanders receiving a gruesome, deep cut above his left eye.

Background
Born and raised in Washington D.C., Sanders attended Theodore Roosevelt High School where he was All-City lineman in football. Sanders turned down various college football offers to stay home and take care of his mother, who was sick. He attended Montgomery College.

Amateur career
Sanders began boxing in 1993 at the age of 19, and had a very brief amateur career before turning professional a year later in 1994.

Professional career
Sanders gained widespread media attention in late 2006, when he fought a series of four-round exhibition bouts against former undisputed heavyweight Mike Tyson during a world tour, which was organized to help pay off Tyson's financial debts. Tyson fought without headgear against the headgeared Sanders, and Tyson appeared to be holding back during the bouts to prevent an early end to the show.

He last fought in December 2007, dropping a six rounds decision to Dennis Bakhtov, which became his seventh loss in a row. His current professional record stands at 23 wins (15 KO), and 13 losses out of 36 fights.

Professional boxing record

|-
| style="text-align:center;" colspan="8"|23 Wins (15 knockouts, 8 decisions), 13 Losses (3 knockouts, 10 decisions)
|-  style="text-align:center; background:#e3e3e3;"
|  style="border-style:none none solid solid; "|Result
|  style="border-style:none none solid solid; "|Record
|  style="border-style:none none solid solid; "|Opponent
|  style="border-style:none none solid solid; "|Type
|  style="border-style:none none solid solid; "|Round
|  style="border-style:none none solid solid; "|Date
|  style="border-style:none none solid solid; "|Location
|  style="border-style:none none solid solid; "|Notes
|- align=center

|Loss
|
|align=left| Denis Bakhtov
|UD
|6
|23/12/2007
|align=left| Halle an der Saale, Sachsen-Anhalt, Germany
|align=left|
|-
|Loss
|
|align=left| Steffen Kretschmann
|UD
|8
|19/10/2007
|align=left| Neukoeln, Berlin, Germany
|align=left|
|-
|Loss
|
|align=left| Kertson Manswell
|UD
|10
|14/10/2006
|align=left| Bacolet, Trinidad and Tobago
|align=left|
|-
|Loss
|
|align=left| Timo Hoffmann
|UD
|12
|28/02/2004
|align=left| Dresden, Sachsen, Germany
|align=left|
|-
|Loss
|
|align=left| Nikolay Popov
|UD
|8
|30/01/2004
|align=left| Ekaterinburg, Russia
|align=left|
|-
|Loss
|
|align=left| Elieser Castillo
|UD
|12
|30/10/2003
|align=left| Coconut Creek, Florida, U.S.
|align=left|
|-
|Loss
|
|align=left| DaVarryl Williamson
|TKO
|5
|26/07/2002
|align=left| Chester, West Virginia, U.S.
|align=left|
|-
|Win
|
|align=left| Oleg Maskaev
|TKO
|8
|17/03/2002
|align=left| Oroville, California, U.S.
|align=left|
|-
|Win
|
|align=left| Terrence Lewis
|MD
|10
|12/01/2002
|align=left| Laughlin, Nevada, U.S.
|align=left|
|-
|Win
|
|align=left| Paea Wolfgramm
|TKO
|9
|08/08/2001
|align=left| Elgin, Illinois, U.S.
|align=left|
|-
|Win
|
|align=left| Willie Williams
|TKO
|4
|06/07/2001
|align=left| Reno, Nevada, U.S.
|align=left|
|-
|Win
|
|align=left| Garing Lane
|UD
|6
|28/04/2001
|align=left| LaPorte, Indiana, U.S.
|align=left|
|-
|Win
|
|align=left| Jeff Lally
|TKO
|2
|12/11/1998
|align=left| Worley, Idaho, U.S.
|align=left|
|-
|Win
|
|align=left| Arthur Weathers
|TKO
|2
|22/09/1998
|align=left| New York City, U.S.
|align=left|
|-
|Loss
|
|align=left| Andrew Golota
|UD
|10
|21/07/1998
|align=left| Atlantic City, New Jersey, U.S.
|align=left|
|-
|Win
|
|align=left| James Gaines
|UD
|10
|20/02/1998
|align=left| Baton Rouge, Louisiana, U.S.
|align=left|
|-
|Win
|
|align=left| Melvin Foster
|TKO
|6
|09/01/1998
|align=left| Atlantic City, New Jersey, U.S.
|align=left|
|-
|Loss
|
|align=left| Marion Wilson
|UD
|8
|29/10/1997
|align=left| Glen Burnie, Maryland, U.S.
|align=left|
|-
|Win
|
|align=left| Derrick Lampkins
|PTS
|8
|16/09/1997
|align=left| Nashville, Tennessee, U.S.
|align=left|
|-
|Win
|
|align=left| Danny Wofford
|DQ
|7
|23/08/1997
|align=left| Alexandria, Virginia, U.S.
|align=left|
|-
|Win
|
|align=left| Biko Botowamungu
|TKO
|2
|14/05/1997
|align=left| Glen Burnie, Maryland, U.S.
|align=left|
|-
|Win
|
|align=left| Lynwood Jones
|TKO
|4
|13/03/1997
|align=left| Glen Burnie, Maryland, U.S.
|align=left|
|-
|Loss
|
|align=left| Jerry Ballard
|TKO
|6
|28/06/1996
|align=left| Upper Marlboro, Maryland, U.S.
|align=left|
|-
|Loss
|
|align=left| Michael Grant
|TKO
|2
|15/03/1996
|align=left| Atlantic City, New Jersey, U.S.
|align=left|
|-
|Win
|
|align=left| Tony Bradham
|UD
|6
|09/02/1996
|align=left| Atlantic City, New Jersey, U.S.
|align=left|
|-
|Win
|
|align=left| Mike Whitfield
|PTS
|6
|30/11/1995
|align=left| Greenbelt, Maryland, U.S.
|align=left|
|-
|Win
|
|align=left|Dale Henry
|TKO
|1
|15/10/1995
|align=left| Washington, D.C., U.S.
|align=left|
|-
|Win
|
|align=left| Mike Mitchell
|TKO
|5
|12/09/1995
|align=left| Woodlawn, Maryland, U.S.
|align=left|
|-
|Win
|
|align=left|Cohen Cosby
|KO
|1
|30/08/1995
|align=left| Washington, District of Columbia, U.S.
|align=left|
|-
|Loss
|
|align=left| Ahmed Abdin
|PTS
|6
|18/08/1995
|align=left| Middletown, New York, U.S.
|align=left|
|-
|Win
|
|align=left| Ken Moody
|TKO
|1
|29/07/1995
|align=left| Washington, D.C., U.S.
|align=left|
|-
|Win
|
|align=left|Tony Campbell
|PTS
|4
|06/06/1995
|align=left| Woodlawn, Maryland, U.S.
|align=left|
|-
|Loss
|
|align=left| Mark Connolly
|PTS
|4
|22/04/1995
|align=left| Las Vegas, Nevada, U.S.
|align=left|
|-
|Win
|
|align=left| Anthony Hunt
|TKO
|1
|11/03/1995
|align=left| Las Vegas, Nevada, U.S.
|align=left|
|-
|Win
|
|align=left| Russell Perry
|TKO
|4
|01/11/1994
|align=left| Woodlawn, Maryland, U.S.
|align=left|
|-
|Win
|
|align=left|Anthony Thomas
|TKO
|2
|23/09/1994
|align=left| Upper Marlboro, Maryland, U.S.
|align=left|
|}

Exhibition boxing record

References

External links
 

Boxers from Washington, D.C.
Heavyweight boxers
1975 births
Living people
American male boxers
African-American boxers
21st-century African-American sportspeople
20th-century African-American sportspeople